Scylla serrata (often called mud crab or mangrove crab, although both terms are highly ambiguous, and black crab) is an ecologically important species of crab found in the estuaries and mangroves of Africa, Australia, and Asia. In their most common forms, their shell colours vary from a deep, mottled green to very dark brown.

Distribution
The natural range of S. serrata is in the Indo-Pacific. It is found from South Africa, around the coast of the Indian Ocean, where it is especially abundant in Sri Lanka, to the Southeast Asian Archipelago, as well as from southern Japan to south-eastern Australia, northern New Zealand, and as far east as Fiji and Samoa. The species has also been introduced to Hawaii and Florida.

In Hawaii, mud crabs are colloquially known as Samoan crabs, as they were originally imported from American Samoa.  As these crabs are known for their robust size and dense meat content, they have been greatly sought after over the years.  As a result of overcrabbing, local government efforts have restricted harvesting of crabs smaller than 6 inches (width across back) and to harvest females of any size is illegal.

Ecology
A study on tidal flats in Deception Bay in Queensland found juvenile crabs ( carapace width) were resident in the mangrove zone, remaining there during low tide, while subadults migrated into the intertidal zone to feed at high tide and retreated to subtidal waters at low tide. Adults ( and larger) were caught mainly below the low-tide mark, with small numbers captured in the intertidal zone at high tide.

These crabs are highly cannibalistic in nature; when crabs undergo molting, other hard-shelled ones sometimes attack the molting crabs and devour them.

References

External links

Australia: Queensland government page on mangrove crab aquaculture
Cycle of the mud crab
Life Cycle of the Mud Crab – Fishnote No.11 March 2007, Northern Territory

Portunoidea
Edible crustaceans
Commercial crustaceans
Crustaceans described in 1775
Taxa named by Peter Forsskål
Australian cuisine